The New York Mutuals baseball club, established 1859, played five seasons in the National Association, 1871–1875, and one in the National League, 1876. Here is a list of all their players in regular season games beginning 1871.

† Bold names identify members of the National Baseball Hall of Fame.



A
Doug Allison

B
Billy Barnie
George Bechtel
Steve Bellán
Eddie Booth
Bill Boyd
Jack Burdock

C
Tom Carey
Bill Craver
Candy Cummings†

D

E
Dave Eggler

F
George Fair
Bob Ferguson
Frank Fleet
Davy Force
Chick Fulmer

G
Count Gedney
Billy Geer
Joe Gerhardt

H
Jimmy Hallinan
John Hatfield
John Hayes
George Heubel
Nat Hicks
Dick Higham
Jim Holdsworth

I

J

K

L
Terry Larkin

M
John Maloney
Phonney Martin
Bobby Mathews
Pat McGee
John McGuinness
John McMullin
Al Metcalf
Charlie Mills

N
Candy Nelson
Al Nichols

O

P
Tom Patterson
Dickey Pearce
Nealy Phelps

Q

R
Jack Remsen

S
George Seward
Jim Shanley
Orator Shaffer
Charlie Smith
Joe Start

T
Fred Treacey
Pete Treacey

U

V
Bob Valentine

W
Billy West
Rynie Wolters

X

Y

Z

References

External links
Franchise index at Baseball-Reference and Retrosheet

Major League Baseball all-time rosters
New York Mutuals